La mentira is a Mexican telenovela produced by Ernesto Alonso for Telesistema Mexicano in 1965. It was set in the Brazilian state Amazonas.

Cast 
 Julissa as Verónica
 Enrique Lizalde as Demetrio
 Fanny Cano as Virginia
 Enrique Rocha as Jhonny
 Alicia Montoya
 Miguel Manzano
 Chela Nájera
 Manolo García
 Aarón Hernán
 Malena Doria
 Carmen Cortés
 Leandro Martínez

References

External links 

Mexican telenovelas
1965 telenovelas
Televisa telenovelas
Spanish-language telenovelas
1965 Mexican television series debuts
1965 Mexican television series endings